Saksakiyeh is a town in the Sidon District of the South Governorate in Lebanon. It has an elevation of 100m.

The town has multiple archaeological features that can be inferred through the presence of a large number of ancient caves, in addition to an old water-powered mill that dates back to the 1800s.

Name
The name "Saksakiyeh" is said to have originated from the family "Sakasik", who originally traveled from Yemen to Lebanon during the Abbasid Period in 64 AH, and lived in what is known today as Beit Lahia. Who Later moved to Sarafand's fort, then relocated to Saksakiyeh.

History
In 1875, in the late Ottoman era, Victor Guérin traveled in the region, and noted about the village (which he called Zekzekieh): "This village, sitting on a height, is divided into two districts, one eastern, the other western. To the west of the latter, I am shown the location of an ancient fortress, now toppled from top to bottom, and from where the inhabitants extracted beautiful ashlars."

World War I
During WWI, the Ottomans set up a gallow in the city center to execute deserters who were forcefully enrolled into the Ottoman army. One of these deserters was Houssein Mohammed Kahloun who had fled 13 times before he was caught after his sister who was threatened by death exposed his location. He was taken to the gallow and hanged. The town's Mukhtar at the time Haidar Mohammad Haidar was taken by Ottoman soldiers and forced to witness the hanging.

World War II
In the summer of 1942 during WWII, a group of French soldier were wandering the street of Saksakiyeh when they were asked about their reason for being there, in which one of the soldiers is said to have replying disrespectfully.

Poet Mohamad Ali Wehbe then attacked the soldiers with a stick he was carrying, his friends (Abd al Azim Helmi, Mohamad Dieb Amer, Hassan Asaad Wehbe, Mohamad Chibli Baghdadi Mroueh, and Ali Hassan Dahi) then joined in the attack, forcing the soldiers to flee.

The soldiers reported the incident to Sergent Dawoud, who later visited the town and threaten the town's leading figures (Mohamad Haj Haidar Haidar, Houssien Al Haj Ali Abass, Chibli Baghdadi Mroue, Mohamad Baker Al Ibrahim). The town's leading figures refused to expose the location of the attackers who had to spend about a year hiding in caves until Lebanon got its independence on 22 November 1943.

Lebanese civil war
A list of Saksakieh Martyrs:

2006 Lebanon War 
On 15 July 2006, an Israeli plane destroyed three bridges, one in Sarafand, one in Saksakieh, and one in Loubiyeh. The Saksakieh bridge attack led to death of the civilian Mohammad Hassan Mustapha Haidar. It took multiple years for the Saksakieh Bridge to be rebuilt completely.

On 5 August 2006, an Israeli warplane fired two missiles at a two-story residential building in Al-Ghassaniyeh, it led to the death of 7 civilians doing a visit from their town of Saksakieh.

Demographic

The population has grown significantly throughout this last century.

The estimate population was 595 in 1927. All being Shia Muslims. The population increased to reach 1,775 in 1965. And to 2,840 in 1981. And 5,223 in 1997. And to 6,231 in 2002.

Education
Education in the town only properly started in around 1920, where Shiekh Khalil Helmi (Known as Al-Masri) educated children in one of the town's leading figure's house (Salim Mohammad Al-Arab). He had 45 students at the time including ones from neighboring towns. Education mostly consisted of learning the Quran and basic algebra. He was preceded by Shiekh Youssif Al-Masri who had about 40 students and educated at the same location until he later moved to Haje Chariefe Tawbi's house.

In 1930, Mohammad Baker Al-Ibrahim took over for about 20 years. He was followed by Sheikh Khalil Mahmoud Asaad Yehya.

Schools were constructed later. Currently the town has 3 schools with 1 of them being a private school and the other 2 being public schools.

Saksakieh Official School
Saksakieh Official School is an English-based school that opened its doors in 1963.

Takamol School
Takamol School opened its door in 1980 and is a private English-based school with classes from preschool to middle school.

Martyr Nehme Mroueh Official High School
Originally named Saksakieh Official High School but it changed its name to Martyr Nehme Mroueh Official High School by a municipal decision in decree 763/16 issued on 18 October 2016.

The administrative and services aspect
The town has a police station, two mosques, a Hussainiya for men and another for women, a dispensary, a governmental hospital and private hospital, a sports club, multiple charitable foundations, the Imam al-Mahdi Scouts, the Islamic Risala Scouts.

Saksakieh Governmental Hospital
The governmental hospital was built in the 1964 as a schistosomiasis center as part of the Litani River Project. However, it was used during the Lebanese Civil War as a military command center by some Lebanese parties and Palestinian organizations, it was then used a field hospital, and later as a police station by the town of Aadloun. It remained a police station for 7 years when it was later used as hospital under the name Musa Al Sadr Hospital, but that only lasted two-year, as in August 1992 it was handed over to the Ministry of Public Health.

In 1988, legal decree 5215/88 issued on 16 September 1988 stated that the schistosomiasis center of Property 496 would become a health center in addition to doing schistosomiasis research.

In 1993, legal decree 3379/93 issued on 7 April 1993 stated that the health center on Property 496 would become the Saksakieh Governmental Hospital (described as a middle sized hospital), this is due to the fact that based on 159/83 issued on 16 September 1983 a middle sized hospital with 70–100 beds at least is required for every 30,000 people.Algeria then provided fund to complete the hospital and purchase the required equipment. Dr Ali Jaber was put in charge.

In 1994, legal decree 5170/94 issued on 25 May 1994 would sets and hospital employees and staff as such:
 
Dr. Hani Shgari was put in charge, and the hospital began to receive patients and provide health services. But not even a year had passed when it had to close its doors due to the lack of funding from the Ministry of Public Health and the lack of staff.

In 2005, legal decree 14159/05 issued on 8 February 2005 stated that a general organization is to be established to run the hospital. In article 2, it is stated that a 3-year board of directors of the organization would be headed by Eng. Ali Haidar Khalifeh with both Dr Faisal Mohammad Baghdadi Mroue and Dr Ibrahim Houssien Matar as board members.

The hospital was meant to operate as an independent entity able to fund itself; however that didn't work as it wasn't able to open its doors, even after being given a sum of 2 million dollar by the Kuwait Fund for Arab Economic Development.

In 2007, legal decree 3/07 issued on 20 September 2007 stated that a new government hospital would be established in the neighboring town of Sarafand and would be approved as the Al-Zahrani district's government hospital, the decree also asks the Lebanese Council for Development and Reconstruction (CDR) to take the necessary steps to implement, construct, and prepare the hospital, the CDR was also given a loan of 10 million dollars to construct the new hospital. In addition, the Saksakieh Governmental Hospital on Property 496 returned to being a health center, as according to the decree the Saksakieh hospital has limited space and beds and can't be considered the district's hospital and the new Sarafand hospital was enough to meet the needs of the citizens in the district.

In 2009, legal decree 1564/09 issued on 26 March 2009 stated that Enayah Ghosn, the head of the Secretariat department at the Ministry of Public Health, would be appointed as a government commissioner at the General Organization for the Management of the Saksakieh Governmental Hospital for a period of one year.

The hospital remained closed until 8 February 2008 when a law degree to transfer it to a public organization by a request from the then minister of public health Jawad Khalifeh.

Politics
The town has 15 municipal councils seats and 4 mukhtar seats. The town had a presence in the 2018 Lebanese general elections with 5,256 voters (5,250 Shia & 6 Sunni).

1963 municipal elections 
The first municipal election took place in 1963 after the Municipals Law of Lebanon 29/63 was issued on 29 May 1963, requesting all town have their own municipality, thus legal decree 1217/63 was issued on 27 December 1963 titled "Establishing a municipality in the village of Saksakieh- Sidon District", and stated that Saksakieh would have 8 municipal members. As such these 8 municipal members were elected:

 Khalil Mohamad Haidar (elected mayor)
 Hossien Yousif Younes
 Mohamad Hassan Abbass
 Hossien Abdo Aliahmad
 Mohamad Ahmed Nasrallah
 Hossien Ahmad Fakih
 Fadel Yousif Siblini
 Mohamad Chibli Baghdadi Mroue
Little to no record is present of the work done by this municipality.

1998 municipal elections 
The second election took place on 7 June 1998 after revision law 665/97  issued on 30 December 1997 (Revising Municipal Act Decree 118 issued on 30 June 1977). 15 Members were be elected out of the 34 candidates. 2,383 voted out of the 3,112 eligible voters (76.57% turnout). The members met on 29 June 1998 and elect Mahmoud Ahmed Dahi as town mayor with Mahmoud Ahmad Moussa as deputy mayor.

2004 municipal elections

2010 municipal elections 
The fourth municipal elections were done on 9 June 2010, there were only 15 candidates and thus they won by default, with Ali Salman Haidar as town mayor.

2016 municipal elections 
The fifth municipal elections that were done on 6 June 2016 had 25 candidates, 15 of which were elected.

Town mukhtars
The first mukhtar of the town was Mohamed Hossein Amer who was a mokhtar during the Ottoman Rule. Followed by Haidar Mohamed Haidar who was mokhtar during the end of the Ottoman Rule. Followed by (in order):

 Abed Al Kassem Fakih
 Chibli Mohamad Baghdadi Mroue
 Mohamed Kassem Ahmad Fakih (Abo Hasib) (For a short period of time)
 Kassem Darwich Haidar (Who later resigned to pass it off to Chibli Mohamad Baghdadi Mroue)
 Mohamed Houssien Abbass (Abo Najib), along with Mohamed Ali Moussa Siblini, Ahmed Hassan Dahi, Mustafa Ahmed Obied, and Mohamad Amin Shoumar in 1963
 Mohamad Ali Sibini (Selected by the Mayor of South Lebanon) who later resigned
 Ahmad Hassan Dahi (Selected by the Mayor of South Lebanon)
 Najib Mohammad Abbass elected on 6 June 1998

Mukhtar elections 2010
3 people were elected as the town's Mukhtars. Three candidates ran for the optional Mukhtar seats thus won by default.

Mukhtar elections 2016
4 out of the 10 candidates were elected as the town's Mukhtars. One candidate ran up for the optional Mukhtar seat and won by default.

Popular families
Some of the popular families in the town include:

 Abbass
 Al-amin
 Al-haj
 Al-hussien
 Aliahmad
 Alloul
 Amer
 Awada
 Badran
 Bandar
 Barakat
 Darwich
 Fakih
 Faroukh
 Haidar
 Hashem
 Hawili
 Hmaidan
 Jradi
 Kawtharani
 Kharoubi
 Mashlab
 Mroue (Baghdadi Mroueh)
 Nasrallah
 Obeid
 Saghir
 Saleh
 Shoumar
 Siblini
 Sohail
 Wehbe
 Younis

Notes

  It's also called Saksakieh, Saksakie, or Saksakiye. And also referred to as Alsaksakieh, Alsaksakie,or Alsaksakiye.

References

Bibliography

External links
Saksakiyeh, Localiban 

Shia Muslim communities in Lebanon
Populated places in Sidon District